The 2009–10 SAFA Second Division season, also known as Vodacom League due to a sponsoring deal at the time, took place in South Africa between August and April. The season was scheduled to begin and end one month earlier than normal, due to the country's 2010 FIFA World Cup preparation. The league is the third tier of South African football, and is divided geographically into five divisions in the Coastal Stream and four divisions in the Inland Stream.

Coastal Stream

Eastern Cape Province 

Leaving for 2010-11: Blackburn Rovers (promoted), African Juventus (relegated).
Joining for 2010-11: Happy Brothers (promoted), Kokstad Liverpool (promoted).

Free State Province 

Leaving for 2010-11: Welkom Real Hearts (relegated), Milan United (relegated).
Joining for 2010-11: Bubchu United (promoted), United All Tigers (promoted).

KwaZulu-Natal Province 

Leaving for 2010-11: Brazil (relegated), Durban Stars (2nd team will disband).
Joining for 2010-11: SAPS Callies (promoted), Gqikazi All Stars (promoted).

Northern Cape Province

Leaving for 2010-11: Namaqua Stars (relegated), Kuruman Rovers (relegated).
Joining for 2010-11: North East Celtics (promoted), Ray Madrid (promoted).

Western Cape Province 

Leaving for 2010-11: Stellenbosch University (relegated), Briton Stars (relegated).
Joining for 2010-11: Beaufortwest City (promoted), Jomo Powers (promoted), Ikapa Sporting (relegated).

Inland Stream

Gauteng Province 

Leaving for 2010-11: FC AK (promoted), Senaoana Blackpool (relegated), Abakah (relegated).
Joining for 2010-11: Supersport United 2nd team (promoted), Lesedi Shooting Stars (promoted).

Limpopo Province 

Leaving for 2010-11: Tebcon (relegated), Bahwiti (relegated), Z. Mathote Elephants (relegated).
Joining for 2010-11: Blue Rocks (promoted), Maniini All Blacks (promoted), Winners Park (relegated).

Mpumalanga Province 

Leaving for 2010-11: Citizen (relegated), York (relegated).
Joining for 2010-11: Lynville All Stars (promoted), Thabo All Stars (promoted).

North-West Province 

Leaving for 2010-11: Sea Rovers (relegated), Bophirima NW Stars (relegated).
Joining for 2010-11: Mamusa United (promoted), Bakubung BK (promoted).

Playoff stage
The nine provincial winners were drawn into a round robin stage. The five Coastal stream teams and four Inland stream teams were put respectively into Group A and Group B. All the playoff matches were played from April 6–12, at two big stadiums in the Mpumalanga region: Themba Senamela Stadium in Mhluzi, Middelburg and Ackerville Stadium in eMalahleni. The respective winners of the two groups, would both gain promotion to the National First Division, beside meeting each other in a last show-off final, where only the champion honour was at stake.

Group A (Coastal)

Group B (Inland)

Playoff final

External links
 SAFA Official Website -database with results of Vodacom League

References

SAFA Second Division seasons
3
South